The 1997 Kazakhstan Top Division was the sixth season of the Top Division, now called the Kazakhstan Premier League, the highest football league competition in Kazakhstan.

Teams
Following the conclusion of the previous season, no teams were promoted or relegated. However Tobol, Munaishy, Kainar and SKIF-Ordabasy all withdrew from the league prior to the start of the season due to financial reasons.

Before the 1997 season started, Kokshe became Avtomobilist, Metallist became Ulytau, Aktobemunai became Aktobe, Tselinnik Akmola became Astana, Shakhter Karagandy became Shakhter-Ispat-Karmet and Vostok became Vostok Adil. Kaisar-Munai became Kaisar-Hurricane half-way through the season, in July.

Team overview

League table

Golden match

Results

Statistics

Top scorers

See also
Kazakhstan national football team 1997

References

Kazakhstan Premier League seasons
1
Kazakh
Kazakh